Patrick Maneschijn (born 4 January 1997) is a Dutch footballer who plays as a forward for Excelsior '31.

Club career
He made his Eredivisie debut for Go Ahead Eagles on 14 May 2017 in a game against Sparta Rotterdam.

Ahead of the 2019–20 season, Maneschijn joined WHC Wezep. The following season, he moved to CSV Apeldoorn.

References

External links
 

1997 births
Footballers from Deventer
Living people
Dutch footballers
Go Ahead Eagles players
Sparta Nijkerk players
WHC Wezep players
Eredivisie players
Eerste Divisie players
Association football forwards
CSV Apeldoorn players